Pihlava is a surname. Notable people with the surname include:

Agnes Pihlava (born 1980), Polish singer
Jarno Pihlava (born 1979), Finnish swimmer